Krupac is a village in the municipality of Pirot, Serbia. According to the 2002 census, the village has a population of 1444 people.

There is a local football club in Krupac called Zadrugar

References

Populated places in Pirot District